The Charles Bukowski Tapes are a collection of short interviews with the American writer/poet Charles Bukowski, filmed and assembled by Barbet Schroeder and first published in 1985. Today, the video documentary is considered a cult classic.

Plot
The Charles Bukowski Tapes are an altogether more than four hours long collection of 52 short-interviews with the American cult author Charles Bukowski, sorted by topic and each between one and ten minutes long. Director Barbet Schroeder (Barfly) interviews Bukowski about such themes as alcohol, violence, and women, and Bukowski answers willingly, losing himself in sometimes minute-long monologues. Amongst other things, Bukowski leads the small camera team through his parents’ house and his former neighbourhood, but the largest part of the interviews takes place in Bukowski's flat or backyard. The documentary includes a scene in which Bukowski reacts violently toward his wife Linda Lee.

History of origin
The documentary was assembled from about 64 hours of film footage, which occurred during the three-year lead time for Schroeder's motion picture Barfly, for which Bukowski wrote the autobiographical script.

Critical reception

References

External links
 

1987 films
Documentary films about writers
French independent films
English-language French films
Documentary films about poets
1980s English-language films
1980s French films